George Thomas Barrett (16 March 1934 – 8 March 2014) was an English footballer.

A defender, Barrett progressed through the youth ranks at Manchester United but left for Plymouth Argyle in 1957. After three years with Plymouth, Barrett moved to Chester, where he played regularly for a season before joining non-league Cheltenham Town.

References

1934 births
2014 deaths
Footballers from Salford
English footballers
Association football defenders
English Football League players
Manchester United F.C. players
Plymouth Argyle F.C. players
Chester City F.C. players
Cheltenham Town F.C. players